Framed is a 1947 American crime film noir directed by Richard Wallace and starring Glenn Ford. The movie is generally praised by critics as an effective crime thriller despite its low budget.

Plot
Naïve mining engineer Mike Lambert (Glenn Ford) takes a temporary job driving a truck.  When the brakes fail while coming down a steep highway, he steers his way through a small town and is lucky to just dent the pickup of Jeff Cunningham (Edgar Buchanan).  Jeff demands Mike's employer pay for the damage, but the man refuses. Mike pays him himself. Later, the police find Mike in a bar and arrest him for reckless driving and having an expired license.  A total stranger, barmaid and local tramp Paula Craig (Janis Carter), pays his $50 fine. When Mike gets drunk, Paula quits her job and finds him a hotel room. Then she meets with her conspirator, Steve Price (Barry Sullivan), and tells him, "I found him", a stranger with the same height and build as Steve.

The next day, Mike goes looking for a job. The clerk at the assay office puts him in touch with Jeff, a prospector who has found a rich vein in an old, abandoned silver mine. He offers to cut Mike in for 10%, a generous offer he quickly accepts. However, Mike makes the mistake of telling Paula all about it. When Jeff goes to get financing from Steve, the vice-president of the Empire Bank, Paula gets him to turn Jeff down.

An opportunist, Steve obtained his position through his wife Beth's father. He has embezzled $250,000 from the bank and hidden it in Paula's safety deposit box. The plan involves a fatal, fiery car crash, with Mike's body to be mistaken for Steve's.

Mike wins some money in a craps game and pays Paula back everything she spent on him. He saw her get in the car with Steve, and is very suspicious of a barmaid with much money. Paula tells him she persuaded Steve to reconsider Jeff's financing. And gullible Mike falls for the lie.

Mike, Steve and Paula drive out to see the mine. On the way back, Steve persuades Mike to stop for a drink at his place. However, when Mike goes to wash his hands, he notices a bath robe which oddly has "Paula" embroidered on it. Still not willing to open his eyes and figure out the danger he is in, Mike gets drunk and passes out. Steve drives him to the spot chosen for the accident, but Paula unexplainably knocks Steve out instead of Mike and sends the car - and Steve - over a cliff. She is able to convince Mike that he accidentally killed Steve in a drunken rage and that she staged the accident to cover for him. She begs him to run away with her. Mike then learns that the authorities know Steve was killed and Jeff has been accused of his murder. After going to see Jeff in jail, Mike suspects Paula, but has no proof. He goes to question Mrs. Woodworth, Steve's secretary, pretending to be a reporter. She confirms that a Helen Bailey called while Jeff was meeting Steve. Mrs Woodworth's suspicious husband calls the police, but Mike punches him and gets away.

He asks Paula if she knows Helen Bailey. She denies it, then heads to the bank to get the money. Mike follows her there and confronts her. She begs him to go with her, but he turns her down, and the police, tipped off by him, place her under arrest.

Cast
 Glenn Ford as Mike Lambert
 Janis Carter as Paula Craig
 Barry Sullivan as Steve Price 
 Edgar Buchanan as Jeff Cunningham
 Karen Morley as Beth Price
 Jim Bannon as Jack Woodworth
 Barbara Woodell as Jane Woodworth

Reception

Critical response
Critic Mark Deming called the film, "[a] superior low-budget film noir." Film critic Dennis Schwartz liked the film and wrote, "Janis Carter gives a very sexy and dangerous performance, which plays off very well against Glenn Ford's very earnest one of the good guys who can't get a lucky break. Even when he finds someone he could love she turns out to be poison, someone who was about to poison his coffee until she was reassured that he does not know something incriminating about her role in the crime. It was an entertaining B-film that ably caught how an honest but desperate man reacts after hooking up with a falsehearted woman. The good performances overcame the cheap production values and slight story."

Noir analysis
Film critic Hans J. Wollstein wrote, "... Framed remains a thrilling example of 1940s film noir at its best: economically told, atmospherically photographed (at, among other places, Lake Arrowhead) and more than competently acted. Carter, especially, is a revelation and it is too bad that she was mostly used by Columbia Pictures for decorative purposes, a sort of second-tier Rita Hayworth."

References

External links
 
 
 
 
 
 

1947 films
1947 crime films
American black-and-white films
American crime films
Columbia Pictures films
Film noir
Films directed by Richard Wallace
1940s English-language films
1940s American films